Philly Joes Beat is an album by American jazz drummer Philly Joe Jones which was released on the Atlantic label in 1960.

Reception

Allmusic gave the album 3 stars.

Track listing 
 "Salt Peanuts" (Dizzy Gillespie, Kenny Clarke) - 6:13
 "Muse Rapture" (John Hines) - 6:01
 "Dear Old Stockholm" (Traditional) - 5:35
 "Two Bass Hit" (Gillespie, John Lewis) - 4:33
 "Lori" (Jimmy Garrison) - 5:21
 "Got to Take Another Chance" (Philly Joe Jones) - 4:03
 "That's Earl Brother" (Gillespie, Gil Fuller, Ray Brown) - 5:04

Personnel 
Philly Joe Jones - drums
Mike Downs - cornet
Bill Barron - tenor saxophone
Walter Davis, Jr. - piano
Paul Chambers - bass

References 

Philly Joe Jones albums
1960 albums
Atlantic Records albums
Albums produced by Nesuhi Ertegun